Øye Church is a parish church of the Church of Norway in Vang Municipality in Innlandet county, Norway. It is located in the village of Øye. It is one of the churches for the Øye parish which is part of the Valdres prosti (deanery) in the Diocese of Hamar. The white, wooden church was built in a long church design in 1747 using plans drawn up by an unknown architect. The church seats about 120 people.

History
This location was problematic over the years. The land was somewhat boggy and the nearby river Rødøla would flood almost every spring and this led to grave sites being disturbed (legend says the coffins would sometimes float to the surface during the flooding). The old Øye Stave Church was torn down and the new church was built in 1746-1747 and the lead builder was Lieutenant C.F. Stielau. It was a half-timbered long church with a rectangular nave and a smaller, rectangular chancel. In 1900, a sacristy was built on the east end of the chancel. The new church was consecrated in 1747.

In 1965, a newly reconstructed Øye Stave Church was built across the street from Øye Church using some of the old materials of the church.

Media gallery

See also
Øye Stave Church
List of churches in Hamar

References

Vang, Oppland
Churches in Innlandet
Long churches in Norway
Wooden churches in Norway
18th-century Church of Norway church buildings
Churches completed in 1747
1747 establishments in Norway